Oriole Park at Camden Yards, commonly known  as Camden Yards, is a baseball stadium in Baltimore, Maryland. It is the home field of Major League Baseball's Baltimore Orioles, and the first of the "retro" major league ballparks constructed during the 1990s and early 2000s. It was completed in 1992 to replace Memorial Stadium.

The stadium is in downtown Baltimore, a few blocks west of the Inner Harbor in the Camden Yards Sports Complex.

History

Construction
Prior to Camden Yards, the predominant design trend of big league ballparks was the symmetrical multi-purpose stadium.  Memorial Stadium, the Orioles' home since they moved from St. Louis in 1954, was an early example of such a design.

In 1984, the Baltimore Colts moved to Indianapolis, in part because Baltimore and Maryland officials refused to commit money for a replacement for Memorial Stadium. Not wanting to risk losing the Orioles and Baltimore's status as a Major League Baseball city, Baltimore and Maryland state officials immediately began planning a new park in order to keep them in town.

The master plan was designed by international design firm RTKL. The stadium design was completed by the architectural firm HOK Sport, which had pioneered retro ballparks at the Minor League level four years earlier with Pilot Field in Buffalo, New York.

HOK Sport's original design was very similar to the new Comiskey Park. However, at the urging of architectural consultant Janet Marie Smith, the Orioles turned it down, preferring a retro-style park. Smith had been hired by Orioles President and CEO, Larry Lucchino, to represent the team as Orioles VP of Planning and Development in the design of the ballpark. The Baltimore-based firm Ashton Design was brought on to the project to develop the signage, graphics, illustrations and logos that dot the stadium, as well as the 19th-century style clock above the scoreboard. Ashton's vintage designs, which echo the team's turn-of-the-century origins, proved influential, and the firm was called upon to complete similar retro redesigns of Fenway Park and Dodger Stadium.

Construction began in 1989 and lasted 33 months. Former Orioles owner Eli Jacobs favored naming the new field Oriole Park, while then-Maryland Governor William Donald Schaefer favored Camden Yards. After considerable debate, a compromise was reached and it was decided that both names were to be used, resulting in the stadium’s long name.

The stadium has the longest name of all 30 MLB stadiums in terms of word count, with five words.

1992–2008

The first contest at Oriole Park at Camden Yards was a 5–3 preseason exhibition win over the New York Mets before 31,286 on April 3, 1992. The ballpark officially opened three days later on April 6 with Rick Sutcliffe pitching a complete game shutout in a season-opening 2–0 victory over the Cleveland Indians before a sellout crowd of 44,568. Chris Hoiles drove in the first official run at Camden Yards with a ground-rule double that scored Sam Horn in the fifth inning.

Camden Yards hosted the 1993 MLB All-Star Game.

On June 18, 1994, an escalator accident injured 43 people; one of the stadium's multiple-story escalators, overcrowded with fans heading to their upper-deck seats, jerked backward, throwing passengers to the bottom landing. On September 6, 1995, Camden Yards witnessed Cal Ripken Jr.'s record-setting 2,131st consecutive game. Exactly one year later, Eddie Murray blasted his 500th home run there.

Two orange seats stand out from the park's dark green plastic chairs. One, located at Section 96, Row 7, Seat 23 in the right-center field bleachers (officially known as the Eutaw Street Reserve sections), commemorates the spot where Murray's 500th home run landed. The other, Section 86, Row FF, Seat 10 in the left field bleachers, was the landing spot for Ripken's 278th home run as a shortstop, breaking Chicago Cubs legend Ernie Banks' record for the position. That home run was hit on July 15, 1993. Ripken finished his career with 345 home runs as a shortstop and 431 overall.

The great success of Camden Yards sparked a trend in the construction of more traditional, fan-friendly ballparks in downtown locations across the U.S. By the  season, all of MLB's 30 teams played in baseball-only parks.

Renovations
After the 2008 season, a new HD video display and scoreboard were installed below the right field bleachers. A new, high fidelity sound reinforcement system was added around the ballpark in 2009.  The Orioles made numerous improvements to their home ballpark and to their spring training facility, Ed Smith Stadium, before the start of the 2011 season. All seats in the lower seating bowl were replaced and drink rails were added in the club level. Several skyboxes were also eliminated and refurbished to make room for more casual party suites, including the Miller Light Flight Deck. The renovation reduced Oriole Park's capacity from 48,876 to 45,971, making it more comparable with newer ballparks.

During the 2011–12 off-season, the Orioles announced further upgrades to Camden Yards in preparation for the 20th anniversary of the park's opening. These improvements included the expansion of concession food choices, widening of the concourses in the upper deck, the installation of a replica of the B&O Railway Warehouse's original canopy, and the addition of a lounge atop the batter's eye in center field, which had previously been inaccessible to fans. All fans are permitted to access the standing area of the lounge and fans can purchase tickets for drink rail seats. The Orioles also opened Dempsey’s Bar and Grill, named for beloved longtime Orioles catcher and TV broadcaster Rick Dempsey, on the ground level of the warehouse that is open before games and on non-game days. The team also erected cast-bronze statues of all the Oriole Baseball Hall of Famers in the picnic area beyond the bullpens in left-center field.

Blocked skyline views
In 2007–08 construction started on two large buildings beyond the stadium's outfield walls — a 757-room Hilton Baltimore hotel north of the stadium occupying a two-city-block area and a high-rise apartment building, both completed in 2009—which have blocked views of the city's skyline from most sections of the grandstand. The Baltimore Sun said on April 21, 2008, "There's just a glimpse of the Bromo Seltzer Tower's crenellated top just to the right of the new Hilton Baltimore Convention Center hotel ... something's drastically different at Oriole Park this year ... the sweeping view of downtown Baltimore that fans have enjoyed for the past 16 seasons has changed considerably..." Sportswriter Peter Schmuck complained, "the big, antiseptic convention hotel ... looms over Camden Yards ... [and] has blocked out the best part of the Baltimore skyline". A Washington Post columnist called it a "cruel cubist joke on a previously perfect ballpark", although others said they were pleased with new construction downtown as indicative of urban revitalization.

Changes in field dimensions
In January of 2022, Orioles general manager Mike Elias announced adjustments to Camden Yards' left field dimensions in an attempt to reduce the stadium’s propensity for home runs. The new configuration resulted in the elimination of the first 10 rows of outfield bleacher seats in sections 72-86, resulting in a net reduction of about 1,100 seats. Major League Baseball approved the adjustments, which cover the area from the left-field corner to the bullpens in left-center field.

As of 2020, Camden Yards’  distance from home plate to the left-field corner was about average for the 30 major league stadiums, though its  distance to left-center was the sixth-shortest in the league. In addition, Oriole Park was one of only eight ballparks with a wall shorter than 8 feet in left and had the shortest wall in left-center field of any venue. The new left-field wall is tied for the sixth-tallest in the majors. The new dimensions to straight away left and left-center make Oriole Park's left field the most spacious in the American League. However, the salient created by the bullpens results in an unusual sight on a modern baseball field — a reduction in dimensions as one moves from left field toward center field. The left-center field dimension marked to the immediate left of the bullpens is 398 feet, while the left-center field dimension marked on the bullpens' wall is 376 feet. This creates a hypothetical scenario in which a batter could hit a longer non-homerun to left field than homerun to left-center field, if the latter is hit into the bullpens.  

The club informed its season-ticket holders in the affected sections of the changes. Although fans who typically sit in those locations will be farther from the infield and home plate, they will remain as close as they were to the field of play. As part of this process, the orange seat honoring franchise icon Cal Ripken Jr.’s 278th home run to set the MLB record for home runs by a shortstop will be moved and used as part of the Oriole Park Exhibit for the ballpark’s 30th anniversary celebration.

B&O Warehouse

The stadium planners incorporated the warehouse into the architecture of the ballpark experience rather than demolish or truncate it. The floors of the warehouse contain offices, service spaces, and a private club. The warehouse has never been hit by a legal home run during regulation play.  However, several players have reportedly struck the wall during batting practice, and it was hit by Ken Griffey Jr. during the Home Run Derby associated with the 1993 MLB All-Star Game.

Eutaw Street
Eutaw Street, between the stadium and the warehouse, is closed to vehicular traffic. Along this street, spectators can get a view of the game or visit the many shops and restaurants that line the thoroughfare, including former Oriole star Boog Powell's outdoor barbecue stand. On game days, pedestrians must have a ticket in order to walk on the part of Eutaw Street adjacent to the stadium; however, on non-game days the street is open to all, while access to the stadium is gated. Sections 90–98, called Eutaw Street palace, are located not in the stadium, but adjacent to Eutaw Street, with the seats descending toward the outfield below. If a game sells out, fans may purchase reduced-price "standing-room only" tickets, which entitle them to enter Eutaw Street and watch the game from two designated standing areas (in the left field bullpen area or above the scoreboard in right field).

Many home run balls have landed on Eutaw Street, and the Orioles organization has marked the spots with small baseball-shaped bronze plaques embedded in the street, though it sometimes takes up to a year for each homer to get a plaque. The first home run to reach Eutaw Street was hit by Mickey Tettleton of the Detroit Tigers on April 20, 1992. The most recent home run to land on Eutaw Street was a shot by Anthony Santander of the Orioles on August 24, 2021. As of June 29, 2019, 100 home runs have landed on Eutaw Street in stadium history. The June 29, 2012 game against the Cleveland Indians was only the second time multiple home runs have landed on Eutaw Street in a single game. The first occurrence was during the April 11, 1997 game against the Texas Rangers when Rafael Palmeiro hit two home runs which landed on Eutaw Street. The single season record for home runs landing on Eutaw Street is eight, set in 2008. Major League Baseball's official website, MLB.com, published an updated list of Eutaw Street records on November 19, 2020.

Notable events
The Orioles celebrated the ballpark's 20th anniversary during the 2012 season and launched the website CamdenYards20.com as part of the celebration. Historically, Oriole Park at Camden Yards is one of several venues that have carried the "Oriole Park" name for various Baltimore franchises over the years.

Notable games

September 6, 1995: Cal Ripken Jr. broke Lou Gehrig's record of 2,130 consecutive games played, and hit a home run during that game. Attendees included President Bill Clinton, Vice President Al Gore, Joe DiMaggio,  and Cal Ripken Sr.
May 17, 1996: Chris Hoiles  hit a rare ultimate grand slam (walk off grand slam down by three runs), doing so in even more dramatic fashion with a full-count in the ninth inning to carry the Orioles to a 14–13 victory over the Seattle Mariners.  In advance of Oriole Park's 25th anniversary, MLB honored the game as #3 most memorable in Oriole Park history.
September 6, 1996: Eddie Murray hit his 500th career home run exactly one year after Cal Ripken Jr. broke Lou Gehrig's consecutive game streak.
October 15, 1997: The Cleveland Indians win Game 6 of the 1997 ALCS 1–0 in 11 innings to win the series 4-2 and advance to the 1997 World Series. To date, this is the closest the Orioles have been to hosting a World Series in Camden Yards, with the last one occurring 14 years before, when they were still playing at Memorial Stadium.
May 3, 1999: The Cuban national baseball team defeats the Orioles 12–6 in the second game of a two-game exhibition series
April 4, 2001: Hideo Nomo pitched the first no-hitter in the history of Camden Yards, walking three and striking out eleven.
October 4, 2001: Tim Raines Sr. played left field and Tim Raines Jr. played center field, in the 5–4 loss to the Boston Red Sox becoming only the second father-son duo to play in the same game.  Ken Griffey Sr. and Ken Griffey Jr. were the only other father-son duo to do so (with the Seattle Mariners, on August 31, 1990).
October 6, 2001: Cal Ripken, Jr.'s final MLB game. Former President Bill Clinton and MLB Commissioner Bud Selig were in attendance.
August 22, 2007: The Texas Rangers beat the Orioles 30–3 in game one of a doubleheader, the highest scoring game in 110 years.
May 31, 2008: Manny Ramirez of the Boston Red Sox hits his 500th home run in a game against the Orioles.
June 30, 2009: The Orioles rallied to score 10 runs against the Red Sox after facing a 10–1 deficit in the 7th inning, breaking the franchise record for the largest comeback, and the Major League Baseball record for the largest comeback by a last place team over a first place team.
September 28, 2011: The Orioles defeated the Boston Red Sox in the final day of the season with a 4-3 walk-off win.  The loss, coupled with the Tampa Bay Rays' 8–7 victory over the New York Yankees at Tropicana Field minutes later, eliminated the Red Sox from postseason contention.  The Red Sox became the first team in baseball history to miss the postseason after leading by as many as nine games for a playoff spot entering the month of September.
May 8, 2012: Josh Hamilton tied the Major League Baseball record for home runs in a game with 4. He went 5 for 5 with four home runs and one double.
October 3, 2014: The Orioles rallied with four runs in the 8th inning to top the Tigers 7–6 in Game 2 of the American League Division Series. 
April 29, 2015: As a result of the 2015 Baltimore riots, the game against the White Sox was closed to the public, the first time that has happened in MLB history.

Ballpark firsts

Design and features

Camden Yards was built on land that once served as the rail yard for the Baltimore and Ohio Railroad's Camden Station. The view from much of the park is dominated by the former B&O Warehouse behind the right-field wall. Some seats in the stadium have a good view of the downtown Baltimore skyline.

The bullpen area was designed after many write-in designs were submitted by the public. Its unique two-tiered design was a first in major league parks.

A picnic area is located above and behind the bullpens. Rows of picnic tables covered by orange umbrellas are available for fans to sit and eat. Many trees are located there, too. Many fans at home games view the game from behind the railing behind the bullpens. Until the 2012 season, the Mid-Atlantic Sports Network's pre- and post-game shows before Orioles home games were televised in an outdoor studio behind the bullpens. Bronze sculptures of the six Orioles greats whose uniform numbers were retired by the ballclub were unveiled individually in the walking zone of the area behind the bullpens throughout the 2012 season. The statues were created by Antonio Tobias Mendez and cast at the locally based New Arts Foundry.

On the street there is a statue of Babe Ruth entitled, Babe's Dream, created in 1996 by sculptor Susan Luery. In the same courtyard, one will find sculptures indicating the retired jersey numbers of the Baltimore Orioles.

The stadium is the first major league park to have an outfield wall made up entirely of straight wall segments since Ebbets Field.

The stadium contains 4,631 club seats and 72 luxury suites. Every seat in the ballpark is green, except for two – one in left field which marks the spot of Cal Ripken's 278th career home run, breaking Ernie Banks' all-time record among shortstops, and one in right field, which marks the spot of Eddie Murray's 500th career home run.

Camden Yards lights spell out "GO ORIOLES" all throughout the month of September.

Seating capacity

Ballparks influenced by Camden Yards

Since its opening day in 1992, Camden Yards was a success and fan favorite. Attendance jumped from an average of 25,722 over the last 10 years of Memorial Stadium's tenure to an average of 43,490 over the first 10 years of Camden Yards' existence. Due to its success, many other cities built traditional-feeling asymmetrical ballparks with modern amenities (such as skyboxes) in a downtown setting. Many of these stadiums, like Camden Yards, incorporate "retro" features in the stadium exteriors as well as interiors; these parks have been dubbed "retro-classic" parks. Other parks, known as "retro-modern" parks, have combined "retro" exteriors with more modern interior elements.

The park also ended a quarter-century trend of multi-purpose stadiums in which baseball and football teams shared the same stadium.  Although intended to cut costs, the fundamentally different sizes and shapes of baseball and football fields made this concept fundamentally inadequate for either sport.  By the 2012 season, all but two teams played in baseball-only parks.

Retro-classic parks include:
Progressive Field in Cleveland, Ohio (1994)
Coors Field in Denver (1995)
Oracle Park in San Francisco (2000)
Comerica Park in Detroit (2000)
PNC Park in Pittsburgh (2001)
Citizens Bank Park in Philadelphia (2004)
Busch Stadium in St. Louis (2006)
Citi Field in Queens, New York City (2009)
New Yankee Stadium in The Bronx, New York City (2009)
Guaranteed Rate Field in Chicago (1991/2011)
This park opened in 1991 as the last of the so-called "modern" ballparks. It was heavily renovated from 2001 to 2011 into a retro-classic park.

Retro-modern parks include:
Progressive Field in Cleveland (1994)
Angel Stadium of Anaheim in Anaheim (1966/1998)
Angel Stadium opened in 1966 as a modern park. From 1979 to 1980, it was converted into a multi-purpose park shared with the NFL's Los Angeles Rams. After the Rams moved to St. Louis after the 1994 NFL season, the stadium was extensively renovated a second time from 1996 to 1998, with the most significant change being the removal of almost all of the seats added for football. The final result was a retro-modern park.
Chase Field in Phoenix (1998)
T-Mobile Park in Seattle (1999)
Minute Maid Park in Houston (2000)
American Family Field in Milwaukee (2001)
Great American Ball Park in Cincinnati (2003)
Petco Park in San Diego (2004)
Nationals Park in Washington, D.C. (2008)
Target Field in Minneapolis (2010)
Truist Park in Cumberland, Georgia (2017)
Globe Life Field in Arlington, Texas (2020)

LoanDepot Park in Miami (opened in 2012), was the first since Camden Yards not classified as a "retro" park, whether of the classic or modern variety. Marlins owner Jeffrey Loria specifically rejected the retro model for the new park, desiring a facility that reflected the 21st-century culture of Miami. Populous, which designed both Camden Yards and LoanDepot Park, was willing to listen; the lead designer for Marlins Park would later say the company was "waiting for a client willing to break the [retro] mold." Stadium planners are labeling LoanDepot Park the first example of contemporary architecture in MLB.

Non-baseball events

Concerts

Papal Mass
On October 8, 1995, Pope John Paul II celebrated Mass at Camden Yards as part of his visit to Baltimore, one of the most prominent non-baseball events at Camden Yards.

Awards and recognitions
In March 2013, Oriole Park was named the No. 3 ballpark in the U.S. by TripAdvisor.

On May 6, 1992, Oriole Park received the Urban Design Award Of Excellence from the American institute Of Architects.

Attendance
Between 1992–2000, the Orioles averaged more than 40,000 spectators per game, with a total attendance of 3.71 million persons in the 1997 season. Since then, attendance has declined to 1.9 million in the 2009 season. The current single game highest attendance record at Camden Yards is 49,828, set on July 9, 2005 against the Boston Red Sox. On April 9, 2019, the low-attendance mark was set, when just 6,585 fans watched the Orioles play the Oakland Athletics. On April 29, 2015, Camden Yards was practically empty after the riots in Baltimore over Freddie Gray. Only two scouts, one scoreboard display operator, the play-by-play commentators for the teams' radio and television networks, and the players showed up to watch, and official attendance was 0. This marks the first time in MLB history that the public was not permitted to attend a baseball game.

On August 19, 2008, the stadium hosted its 50 millionth fan, a milestone reached in just 17 seasons, the fastest park in baseball history to reach such a figure. Since opening in 1992, Oriole Park has hosted the third-most number of fans in Major League Baseball, exceeded only by Dodger Stadium and the first Yankee Stadium.

Access and transportation

On the far side of the B&O Warehouse is the present Camden Station, served by both the Baltimore Light RailLink and MARC's Camden Line commuter rail service. The latter rail line provides direct service to Washington, D.C., and the former to BWI Airport. The Light RailLink service began around the time the stadium opened. Nearby Convention Center station also sees heavy traffic during Orioles games; the station is located near the stadium's main entrance.

The stadium is located in downtown Baltimore, near the Inner Harbor. The ballpark, along with the adjacent M&T Bank Stadium, home of the Baltimore Ravens of the National Football League, make up the Camden Yards Sports Complex, though Camden Yards generally refers to only the baseball stadium. The football stadium was not built until 1998, the Ravens' third season in existence. Camden Yards is just a short walk from Babe Ruth's birthplace, which is now a museum. According to some sources, Ruth's father once owned a pub located in what is now center field of the stadium.

In May 2005, a new sports museum, the Sports Legends Museum at Camden Yards, opened in Camden Station. It lasted only 10 years, closing on October 12, 2015.

In popular culture
The movie Dave (1993) features a scene with the President of the United States, played by Kevin Kline, throwing out the first pitch at Camden Yards. That scene was filmed in front of an actual capacity crowd at the ballpark, prior to a regular-season game in early August 1992. Similar scenes were filmed for the Chris Rock movie Head of State, for the Geena Davis TV Series Commander in Chief, and for the 2004 season finale of The West Wing. A short clip in the 2005 film Wedding Crashers shows Oriole Park at Camden Yards.
The movie Major League II (1994) used Camden Yards as the home of the Indians.
Part of the sixth-season premiere of the NBC police drama series Homicide: Life on the Street was filmed at Camden Yards. In these scenes, the detectives must hurry to solve a murder at Camden Yards before a game between the Orioles and the New York Yankees ends.
The pilot of the HBO 2009 comedy series Eastbound & Down begins with an aerial shot of Camden Yards; however, when actor Danny McBride takes the mound, the field level shot is at a different ballpark.
A portion of an episode of the HBO series The Wire, a show about police officers and drug dealers in Baltimore, was filmed during an actual Orioles game in which characters Jimmy McNulty and Bunk Moreland, played by Dominic West and Wendell Pierce, take their sons to a game while discussing a case.
The HBO series Veep filmed episode 6 of their first season, which aired May 27, 2012 at Camden Yards. Orioles Hall of Fame pitcher Jim Palmer and then Orioles players Jake Arrieta and Tommy Hunter made cameo appearances on the field with Veep star Julia Louis-Dreyfus. This was perhaps a subtle homage to Louis-Dreyfus's previous role as Towson-native Elaine Benes on Seinfeld and that character's Orioles fandom. 
House of Cards features Vice President of the United States Frank Underwood (Kevin Spacey) throwing out a ceremonial first pitch at Camden Yards. Spacey, a noted Orioles fan who actually threw a real ceremonial first pitch against the Blue Jays in 2013, is first seen wearing a jacket featuring the cartoon bird in the tunnel to the team dugout as he is being introduced to the crowd. Former closer Jim Johnson and outfielder Nate McLouth meet Spacey's character on the field, with Johnson expecting to receive the pitch as the stadium lights suddenly go out. For added realism, the crowd even yells "O" during the national anthem.

References

External links

Stadium site on MLB.com
Ballpark Digest Visit to Oriole Park at Camden Yards
Summary of Camden Yards
Why Is It Named Oriole Park at Camden Yards? - Ghosts of Baltimore blog
Technical information on Camden Yards
"Top 10 Ballparks" by Men's Fitness

1992 establishments in Maryland
Baltimore Orioles stadiums
Baseball in Baltimore
Baseball venues in Maryland
Downtown Baltimore
Major League Baseball venues
Populous (company) buildings
Sports venues completed in 1992
Sports venues in Baltimore